This article is a summary of the major literary events and publications of 1734.

Events
January – Le Cabinet du Philosophe, a new periodical by Pierre de Marivaux, is unsuccessfully launched; it is discontinued in April.
June 10 – Copies of Voltaire's Lettres philosophiques sur les Anglais (Letters on the English) are burned, and a warrant is issued for the author's arrest.
November – George Faulkner begins publication of an edition of Jonathan Swift's Works in Dublin with a corrected text.
Manoel da Assumpcam begins writing his grammar of the Bengali language.
Göttingen State and University Library is established.

New books

Fiction
Pierre de Marivaux – Le Paysan parvenu (The Fortunate Peasant) part one

Drama
Henry Carey, as "Benjamin Bounce" – Chrononhotonthologos (satire on bombastic tragedy)
William Duncombe – Junius Brutus
Henry Fielding
Don Quixote in England
The Intriguing Chambermaid
Carlo Goldoni – Belisario
 John Hewitt – Fatal Falsehood
James Miller – The Mother-in-Law (adapted from Molière'''s Le Malade imaginaire and Monsieur de Pourceaugnac)
William Popple – The Lady's RevengeJames Ralph – The Cornish SquireAntónio José da Silva – EsopaidaJames Thomson – The Tragedy of SophonisbaPoetry

Jean Adam – Miscellany PoemsMary Barber – PoemsStephen Duck – Truth and FalsehoodWilliam DunkinThe Lover's WebThe Poet's PrayerAlexander PopeEssay on ManAn Epistle to Lord Cobham ("Moral Epistle I")The First Satire of the Second Book of HoraceSober Advice from HoraceJonathan Swift – A Beautiful Young Nymph Going to BedNon-fiction
Anonymous – A Rap at the Rhapsody (on Swift's 1733 On Poetry)
Joseph Addison (died 1719) – A Discourse on Antient and Modern LearningJohn Arbuthnot – Gnothi Seauton: Know YourselfFrancis Atterbury – SermonsGeorge Berkeley – The AnalystHenry Brooke – Design and Beauty: an EpistleIsaac Hawkins Browne – On Design and BeautyDimitrie Cantemir – History of the Growth and Decay of the Ottoman Empire (first publication)
Robert Dodsley – An Epistle to Mr. PopeJohn Jortin – Remarks on Spenser's PoemsLady Mary Wortley Montagu – The Dean's Provocation for Writing the Lady's Dressing-Room (on Swift's "The Lady's Dressing Room")
Karl Ludwig von Pöllnitz – MémoiresJonathan Richardson – Explanatory Notes on Milton's Paradise LostGeorge Sale – The KoranEmanuel SwedenborgFirst Principles of Natural ThingsOpera philosophica et mineraliaThe Infinite and the Final Cause of CreationJoseph Trapp – Thoughts Upon the Four Last Things ("Death, Judgment, Heaven, Hell")
Voltaire – Lettres anglaisesBirths
January 10 – Fleury Mesplet, French-born Canadian writer and newspaper publisher (died 1794
July 25 – Ueda Akinari, Japanese poet and novelist (died 1809)
October 23 – Nicolas-Edme Rétif, French novelist (died 1806)
December 31 – Claude Joseph Dorat (Le Chevalier Dorat), French writer (died 1780)Unknown dates''
Catharina Ahlgren, Swedish writer (died 1800)
Robert Aitken, Scottish-born American printer and publisher (died 1802)

Deaths
January 6 – John Dennis, English dramatist and critic (born 1658)
February 24 – Marie-Jeanne L'Héritier, French writer of fairy tales and salonnière (born 1664)
March 1 – Roger North, English biographer and lawyer (born 1653)
April 25 – Johann Konrad Dippel, German theologian (born 1673)
May – Richard Cantillon, Irish-born French economist (born 1680)
September 17 – Thomas Fuller, English man of letters and proverb collector (born 1654)
October – Thomas Lloyd, Welsh lexicographer (born c. 1673)
October 18 – James Moore Smythe, English dramatist and fop (born 1702)

References

 
Years of the 18th century in literature